Aaron Plessinger (born January 25, 1996) is an American professional motocross and supercross racer. Plessinger has ridden professionally in the AMA Supercross Championship and the AMA Motocross Championship since 2015. 

In 2018, Plessinger became AMA Supercross Champion in the 250SX West class and the AMA Motocross Champion in the 250 class. Plessinger also represented his country in that season's Motocross des Nations.

He currently rides for the Red Bull KTM Factory Racing team.

Career

250 career 
Plessinger began his professional career with the Yamalube Star Racing Yamaha team in 2015. Starting in the 250SX West category, Plessinger was able to finish in fifth place on his AMA Supercross Championship debut, a result he would repeat at the following round. He would go on to grab his first professional supercross podium a few rounds later in Anaheim, with a third behind Cooper Webb and Jessy Nelson. The 2015 AMA National Motocross Championship would continue Plessinger's impressive debut professional season, placing consistently in the top-10 before getting his first overall podium with third at Washougal. At the final round, Plessinger was able to record a second in the first race and won the second race to record his first overall victory in AMA Motocross.

The 2016 AMA Supercross Championship would see Plessinger move to the 250SX East class and eventually finish runner-up to champion Malcolm Stewart. As part of this he took his first professional supercross win in Indianapolis, alongside three other podiums. In the AMA motocross season, Plessinger would have a final championship position of fifth, including a race win at the final round. Plessinger swapped back to the 250SX West class for 2017, where he would finish third – picking up a win in Seattle and five other podiums. This would be backed up by his best motocross season yet, finishing fourth in the final 250 standings, picking up hid second overall win in Tennessee.

For Plessinger, 2018 would be his most successful season to date. He would clinch the 250SX West title, picking up four wins during a tight championship battle with Adam Cianciarulo. In the summer, Plessinger would win the 250 class in the 2018 AMA National Motocross Championship by 110 points over his nearest rival and with six overall wins to his name. Plessinger received his first call up to ride for his country at the 2018 Motocross des Nations, on home turf at Red Bud.

450 career 
Staying with Yamaha, Plessinger would move up to the 450 class for both supercross and motocross in 2019. He would have a consistent start to his maiden 450 class supercross campaign, with a best place of fifth in Atlanta. However, a broken heel sustained at the Daytona International Speedway round meant he missed the second half of the season, as well as the first half of his debut 450 motocross season. In the COVID-19 impacted 2020 supercross season, Plessinger 11th in the final standings with a best finish of sixth in Daytona. A wrist injury sustained training ahead of the outdoor season ruled him out for the entire 2020 AMA National Motocross Championship. 2021 would be Plessinger's last season on a Yamaha. He significantly improved in the 450 class in supercross, finishing fifth in the final standings and a podium at Daytona. He had a strong start to the 2021 AMA National Motocross Championship, with a third overall at the opening round. This result was repeated at round four, however he missed the final part of the season due to injury.

For 2022, Plessinger signed a two-year deal with the Red Bull KTM Factory Racing team. He made a strong start to the 2022 AMA Supercross Championship, with a second place at round two. However, a practice crash before round eight ruled him out of the rest of the supercross season with a broken arm. He managed to return to fitness for the AMA motocross season, where he picked up two podiums on the way to seventh overall in the final standings.

Honours 
AMA Supercross Championship
 250SX West: 2018 , 2017 
 250SX East: 2016 
AMA Motocross Championship
 250: 2018

Career statistics

Motocross des Nations

AMA Supercross Championship

By season

AMA National Motocross Championship

By season

References

Living people
1996 births
American motocross riders